Battle of Fort McAllister may refer to:

 Battle of Fort McAllister (1864)
 Battle of Fort McAllister (1863)